Fairfield University is a private Jesuit university in Fairfield, Connecticut. It was founded by the Jesuits in 1942. In 2017, the university had about 4,100 full-time undergraduate students and 1,100 graduate students, including full-time and part-time students. It offers bachelor's degrees, master's degrees, and doctoral degrees through its five schools and colleges.

History
In 1941, Rev. James H. Dolan, S.J., Provincial for the New England Province of the Society of Jesus, received written permission from Bishop Maurice F. McAuliffe of the Hartford Archdiocese to establish a Jesuit high school and college in the southwestern area of Connecticut.  Fairfield University was officially founded in 1942 when the Jesuits acquired the two contiguous estates of the Brewster Jennings and Walter Lashar families.  Upon its founding, it became the 26th Jesuit college/university in the United States.

In the same year, Rev. James H. Dolan, S.J. appointed the Rev. John J. McEleney, S.J. as the first President of the "Fairfield University of Saint Robert Bellarmine, S.J." and Vicar of the Fairfield College Preparatory School. In 1944, the Rev. James H. Dolan, S.J. himself, became the second President. During his tenure, the State of Connecticut chartered Fairfield University to grant degrees in 1945.  In 1947, the College of Arts and Sciences admitted its first class of 303 male students.  The State of Connecticut accredited the College of Arts and Sciences and the university held its first summer session of undergraduate courses in 1949.

In 1970, Fairfield became co-educational, admitting its first undergraduate class of women.  In the same year, the School of Nursing, which is now part of the Marion Peckham Egan School of Nursing and Health Studies was formed, offering four year undergraduate programs.

The 1971 Supreme Court case Tilton vs. Richardson established an important legal precedent concerning the Establishment Clause of the First Amendment and government financial assistance to religious-based colleges and universities.  This landmark court case questioned the legality of Fairfield and three other Connecticut religious-based institutions securing federal construction grants under the Higher Education Facilities Act of 1963. An appeal by the plaintiffs was denied by the Supreme Court on June 28, 1971, ensuring Fairfield a significant amount of federal money which contributed to the construction of the Nyselius Library (1968) and Bannow Science Center (1971).

In 1978, the School of Business, now known as the Dolan School of Business, was established, as a separate and standalone school.  Prior to this the Department of Business was part of the College of Arts and Sciences. At the same time, the school began offering its first graduate business degree program, a Master of Science in Financial Management.

Aloysius P. Kelley, S.J. was installed as the school's seventh president in 1979.  He would become Fairfield's longest serving leader, presiding over the school for 25 years.  During his tenure, the relatively young school enjoyed a period of expansive growth.  This period saw the construction of dozens of new campus buildings, the addition of multiple new undergraduate and graduate degree programs, and an increase the institution's endowment from under $2 million in 1979 to $131 million by 2003.

Under Kelley, the School of Engineering was formed after the acquisition of Bridgeport Engineering Institute in August 1994, offering both undergraduate and graduate degree programs. The university was accepted as a member institution into Phi Beta Kappa in 1995.

In 2004, Jeffrey P. von Arx, S.J. became the eighth president of the university, having served as an administrator at fellow Jesuit institutions in Georgetown University and Fordham University prior.  That year von Arx launched the capital campaign, "Our Promise: The Campaign for Fairfield University," which raised a then record of $137.9 million. The capital raised resulted in the construction and renovation of seven buildings, the creation of four new academic chairs, and the significant increase in the university's endowment.  In October 2006, the school opened the Aloysius P. Kelley. S.J. Center, named in honor of its longtime president.  The building in the center of campus is an environmentally friendly welcoming center and administrative center.

After a twelve-year tenure, von Arx announced he would be leaving his position in 2016. A national search for his replacement followed, 
and on July 1, 2017, the school announced the appointment of Mark R. Nemec, who became the first lay president in the history of the university. Prior to Fairfield, Nemec was the Dean of the Graham School of Continuing Liberal and Professional Studies at the University of Chicago.

Academics
Fairfield University is composed of five schools and colleges: the Fairfield University College of Arts and Sciences, the Charles F. Dolan School of Business, the School of Engineering, the Marion Peckham Egan School of Nursing and Health Studies, and the Graduate School of Education and Allied Professions.

The university offers 43 majors and 19 minors for undergraduate students, as well as 41 different graduate programs.  In 2016–17, the university awarded 930 bachelor's degrees, 367 master's degrees, and 36 doctoral degrees. Since 1993, 65 Fairfield students have been awarded Fulbright Scholarships.

Academic and spiritual centers at the university include the Center for Faith and Public Life, the Center for Catholic Studies, the Center for Ignatian Spirituality, and the Carl and Dorothy Bennett Center for Judaic Studies.

Among undergraduates, the most popular majors ranked in order of popularity are Nursing, Finance, Marketing, Accounting, Communication, Psychology, Biology, and English. The current freshman retention rate is 90%, and the four year graduation rate among the most recent graduating class was 80%.

The faculty to student ratio is currently 12:1.  The average class size is 22 students, and 80% of classes have under 30 students in them.  As of fall 2017, there are 270 full-time and 319 part-time faculty members.  Of the full-time faculty, 90% have a doctorate, 3% have a terminal master's, and 7% have a master's.

Rankings

 Ranked 115 overall for 2023 among "National Universities" by U.S. News & World Report, 29 for "Best Undergraduate Teaching", second for "Most Innovative", and 147 for "Best Value" in the National category.
 For 2020, Washington Monthly ranked Fairfield University 39th among 614 Master's universities in the U.S. based on its contribution to the public good, as measured by social mobility, research, and promoting public service.
 Kiplinger's Personal Finance places Fairfield 41st in its 2019 ranking of the 177 best value private universities in the United States.

Undergraduate admissions
According to U.S. News & World Report, Fairfield is deemed a "More Selective" university.  The school accepts the Common Application for admission. In the Fall of 2010, the school moved to a "test optional" admissions policy but recommended scheduling an interview for students who do not submit standardized test scores.  Approximately 90% of students receive some type of financial assistance. Fairfield has the lowest percentage of Pell Grant recipients of any college in the United States.

For fall 2019, Fairfield received 12,315 freshmen applications; 7,035 were admitted (57.1%), and 1,176 enrolled. The average GPA of the enrolled freshmen was 3.64, while the middle 50% range of composite SAT scores were 1220–1340, 610-670 for evidence-based reading and writing, and 600-680 for math. The middle 50% range of the ACT composite score was 26–30.

Region and campus

Town of Fairfield

Fairfield University is located in Fairfield, Connecticut, a coastal town along Long Island Sound. It is less than 60 miles from New York City and approximately 1 hour 20 minutes away by Metro-North Railroad.  As of the 2010 census, the town had a population of 59,404. Fairfield is known for its historic downtown, and its beaches - Jennings and Penfield Beach - which are only a few miles from the university campus.

Main campus

Fairfield's  campus consists of 35 buildings anchored by the three manor homes of the original estates: Bellarmine Hall (1921), formerly the Lashar's 'Hearthstone Hall', renamed to honor Saint Robert Bellarmine, S.J; McAuliffe Hall (1896), originally O.G. Jennings' 'Mailands', renamed for Bishop Maurice F. McAuliffe, who sanctioned the creation of Fairfield University; and David J. Dolan House, Lawrence Jenning's 'Larribee', dedicated to honor the uncle of Charles F. Dolan who made the 1989 acquisition of Dolan Campus possible.

Bellarmine Hall, the main administration building on campus, is named in honor of Saint Robert Bellarmine, S.J.  Many of the classrooms and residence halls on the campus are named in honor of Jesuit priests. Behind each building name is a story of a Jesuit priest who was an exemplar of the Jesuit mission and their pursuit of educational and intellectual contributions, human rights, and social justice.

The Barone Campus Center (named in honor of university Provost and Chemistry Professor Dr. John Barone), is the home for student life including the Tully Dining Commons, the Oak Room, the Main Dining Hall, offices for FUSA, StagCard, WVOF, Residence Life, and Student Affairs.

Built in 1968, the DiMenna-Nyselius Library originally was named the Nyselius Library in honor of benefactors Gustav and Dagmar Nyselius. They were Swedish immigrants who had settled in Stamford and wanted to make a donation to Fairfield University. In 2001, the Library underwent a major renovation and expansion and was renamed the DiMenna-Nyselius Library in recognition of a donation from alumnus Joseph A. DiMenna, Jr. '80.

The campus is home to Fairfield College Preparatory School (Fairfield Prep), which is a 900-student all-male preparatory high school that has been aligned with the college since its founding in 1942.  It is located at the southeastern corner of the campus, near the entrance on North Benson Road.

Environmental sustainability

In 2007, the university opened a $9.5 million combustion turbine-based combined heat and power plant on its campus with a capacity of 4.6 MW; the university was honored by the United States Environmental Protection Agency (EPA)  with a 2010 Energy Star CHP Award for the project. 
In 2008, university president von Arx signed the American College & University Presidents' Climate Commitment, a high-visibility effort to address global warming by garnering institutional commitments to neutralize greenhouse gas emissions, and to accelerate the climate change mitigation efforts in research and education.

In 2011, a $12.5 million, 22,000-square-foot contemporary-style home for the Jesuit priests of Fairfield University (then numbering 22) was completed; the building is located near the center of campus and contains sustainable elements.  In August 2009, Fairfield University became the first university in the United States to install Tomra UNO reverse vending machines (RVM), an all-in-one recycling machine for bottle deposits.

Student life
, the university had about 4,100 full-time undergraduate students and 1,100 graduate students (full-time and part-time).  76.9% of undergraduates were white, 7.5% were Hispanic and Latino Americans,  2.2% were black or African American and 2.3% were Asian.  As of fall 2017, there were 125 international students in the undergraduate class (including non-degree-seeking and part-time international students) and 100 international graduate students.  The student population is represented by students from 32 states and 55 foreign countries.  The gender composition of the most recently admitted class is 58.8% female and 41.2% male.

Community service
The goal of Jesuit education is homines pro aliis, "men and women for others". As a result, Fairfield students are involved in many community service opportunities.  Fairfield was among 119 colleges in the United States named to the Carnegie Classification for Community Engagement in 2008. The university was named to the 2009 and 2010 President's Higher Education Community Service Honor Roll by the Learn and Serve America Program of the Corporation for National and Community Service.

The Annual Hunger Clean Up is a one-day service-a-thon where the university community works at 40-plus local agency sites throughout Fairfield County and to raise money for local and national hunger and homelessness causes.  The Fairfield chapter of Colleges Against Cancer hosts an annual American Cancer Society Relay for Life, an overnight event designed to spread awareness of cancer prevention, treatments and cures, celebrate cancer survivors and raise money for cancer research.  The Adrienne Kirby Family Literacy Project, recognized as a model program by the Corporation for National and Community Service, involves about 175 Fairfield student-volunteers a year in providing individual tutoring to preschool children at the Action for Bridgeport Community Development's Early Learning/Head Start Program.

Internationally, 'Ignatian Solidarity Corps volunteers annually participate in two-week international service trips during their spring and winter breaks traveling to Ecuador, Mexico, Jamaica, Belize and Haiti.  In 2004, Mikaela Conley '06 and Aamina Awan '07 founded The Afghan Children's Project to raise awareness and funds for children who have suffered the effects of war, violence, and poverty in Afghanistan.  Both were interviewed on CNN Daybreak in August 2005 for their work in funding the building of a water well for Aloudine, a small village outside Kabul.  And in 2008, nine Fairfield students, inspired by 2006 Nobel Peace Prize recipient Muhammad Yunus and the Grameen Bank, started Sustainable Equity for Women, a micro-lending project designed to raise and invest money in small businesses run by women in developing countries in conjunction with
Kiva Microfunds.

Fairfield University Student Association
The Fairfield University Student Association (FUSA) is the official student association for full-time undergraduate students and is the largest student organization on campus.  The association exists to represent student issues and concerns to the faculty and administration and to sponsor a multitude of student programs and activities. All full-time undergraduate students are members. The association is organized into three branches –  legislative, executive, and the judiciary (FUSA Court). The legislative branch consists of the Student Senate, comprising 20 elected representatives (5 from each undergraduate class year). The executive branch is headed by the popularly elected President of FUSA, who serves as the official spokesperson for undergraduate students in addition to administering the student association on a daily basis. In 2002, Karen Donoghue '03 became the first woman elected President of FUSA. The FUSA President is assisted by a popularly elected vice president, elected class officers, and a number of other appointed officers, including the Director of Programming, the Director of the Club Operations and Student Organisations(COSO), the Director of Marketing & Public Relations, the Director of the Treasury, and the Director of Diversity and Inclusion. The judicial branch, known as the FUSA Court, facilitates elections, serves as a hearing body in appeals, as well as performing the judicial functions required for the student association.

Student activism
A central tenet of a Jesuit education is the promotion of the values of peace and social justice. In 1988, 1989 and 1990, the Coalition for a Better World constructed "Cardboard City" and held a 36-hour vigil,  and again in 2008, the Students for Social Justice constructed "Homeless Village" and hosted the "Oxfam Hunger Banquet" to raise awareness of the plight of the homeless in the United States.  In 1999, students staged an 11-hour sit-in at the home of the university president and later a hunger strike to protest a contracting company used by the university that the students said was anti-union and paid janitors poorly.  Each year, the Students for Social Justice travel to Columbus, Georgia for the annual School of the Americas Watch protest at a combat training school for Latin American soldiers now known as the Western Hemisphere Institute for Security Cooperation. The date of the protest marks the anniversary of the murder of six Jesuit priests, their maid, and her daughter in El Salvador at the hands of soldiers trained at the School of the Americas.  And in 2008, Fairfield for Peace NOW created "Hope Trail", a pathway of flags around campus symbolizing the cost in life and casualties from the Iraq War, and A Cry For Peace, a play written and performed with Theatre Fairfield demonstrating the toll of the Iraq War on the families of soldiers back in the United States.

Student media
 StagsTV – The Student Television Station of Fairfield University
 The Mirror – The Independent Student Newspaper of Fairfield University
 WVOF – The Voice of Fairfield University

Athletics

Fairfield University is a member of the Metro Atlantic Athletic Conference (MAAC) and is classified as NCAA Division I for a majority of its athletic programs. It sponsors 20 varsity sports – baseball, men's and women's basketball, men's and women's crew, men's and women's cross country, field hockey, men's and women's golf, men's and women's lacrosse, men's and women's soccer, softball, men's and women's swimming and diving, men's and women's tennis, and women's volleyball. Men's lacrosse is a member of the Colonial Athletic Association and field hockey is an associate member of the America East Conference.

Basketball
The men's basketball team is currently coached by Jay Young. The Stags have participated in National Invitational Tournament in 1973, 1974, 1978, 1996, 2003 and 2011, and the NCAA Division I men's basketball tournament in 1986, 1987 and 1997.

In the first round of the 1997 NCAA Tournament, the Stags nearly achieved a historic upset over top ranked and Final Four bound North Carolina, leading the Tar Heels by seven points at halftime, before ultimately losing 82–74. UNC's win was Coach Dean Smith's 876th win as a Division I college coach, tying him for first all-time. That record has since been broken.

In 2010, during the first round of the CIT, the team set the national record for the largest comeback in Division I college basketball postseason history by overcoming a 27-point deficit with under 16 minutes to play to defeat George Mason in overtime, 101–96.

Head coach Ed Cooley was named the Ben Jobe National Coach of the Year in 2010. Thirteen Stags have been either drafted or signed to play in the NBA.

The women's basketball team has won the MAAC title in 1988, 1991, 1998, and 2022 and regular season titles in 1990, 1991, 2000, and 2022.  They are currently coached by Joe Frager.

Lacrosse

The men's lacrosse team currently competes in the Colonial Athletic Association (CAA).  The team has previously competed in the MAAC, GWLL, and ECAC.  Since 1996, the team has won 8 Conference Regular Season Titles and 2 Conference Tournament Titles.  The team has been ranked nationally over the years, and earned berths to the 2003 and 2005 NCAA Men's Lacrosse Championship tournaments. 14 players have received All-American honors over the years, and 12 players have gone on to play professionally in Major League Lacrosse (MLL).

The team plays their home games at the lacrosse-only Rafferty Stadium and are currently coached by Andrew Baxter, who succeeded Andrew Copelan in 2019.

On April 21, 2013, men's lacrosse set the school record for the defeat of the highest ranked opponent in any sport, when the Stags upset the Denver Pioneers 9–8, who were then ranked no. 1 in the United States.  The previous record was set on March 13, 2010, when the Stags upset the then no. 3 nationally ranked (and eventual 2010 NCAA tournament runner-up) Notre Dame Fighting Irish 10–8 while competing in the inaugural 'Beating Cancer With A Stick Classic' at The Kinkaid School in Houston, Texas.

The women's lacrosse team has won 12 MAAC Regular Season Titles in the last decade and earned a berth to the 2009, 2015, 2018, 2021, and 2022 NCAA Women's Lacrosse Championship.

Soccer
The Fairfield Stags men's soccer team won the 2005, 2006 and 2011 MAAC Regular Season Championship as well as the 1999, 2006, 2008 and 2011 MAAC Tournament Championship. In 2012 Fairfield goalkeeper, Michael O'Keeffe, was called up to play with the New Zealand National Team's Olympic squad. In summer 2021 Matt Turner (soccer) was called up to the US Men's National Team and won the Gold Cup Golden Glove award for best Goalkeeper of the tournament.

The women's soccer team has advanced to the NCAA Women's Soccer Championship five times and has won the MAAC Championship seven times since 1993.

Volleyball
The Fairfield Women's Volleyball team have won the 1998, 1999, 2000, 2002, 2004, 2005, 2006, 2007, 2008, 2009, 2012, 2013, 2015, 2016, 2017, 2019, 2021 MAAC Regular Season Championships. The Stags have also won the 1997, 1998, 1999, 2000, 2001, 2012, 2013, 2015, 2016, 2017, 2019 MAAC Tournament Championships. Head Coach Todd Kress has coached for 11 seasons with an overall record of .694 and 234 Wins. The team has an overall record of 649-469 (.581) and overall MAAC Record of 314-71 (.816).

Club sports
Sport clubs offer baseball, equestrian, men's and women's ice hockey, martial arts, men's and women's rugby, sailing, men's and women's skiing and snowboarding, men's and women's soccer, men's and women's track and men's and women's volleyball.

The Men's Rugby Football Club or Red Ruggers, established in 1963, is the longest continuously running sport club at Fairfield University.  The Red Ruggers won the 2008 MET NY Rugby Football Union Division II Title and have produced two USA Rugby Collegiate All-Americans.  Former Red Ruggers Paul Sheehy '81 competed for the USA Eagles at the 1991 Rugby World Cup and Will Brazier '05 competed for the United States national rugby league team at the 2004 Liberty Bell Cup.

The Equestrian Club was Regional Champions in 1996, 1997, 1999, 2000, 2002, & 2003 and in 2007 seven Fairfield riders were invited to the elite Tournament of Champions, a horse show for the nation's top collegiate equestrian teams.

The Men's Hockey Club (formerly an NCAA level Division I program of the now-defunct MAAC) competed in the 2007 MCHC Championship game and the 2008, 2015, 2016, 2017, 2018 ACHA National Tournaments.

The Men's Volleyball Club won the 2006 and 2007 New England Collegiate Volleyball League Division II Championship and competed in the 2001, 2002, 2005, 2006 and 2008 National Intramural-Recreational Sports Association (NIRSA) Volleyball Championships.

Arts and culture

Quick Center for the Arts

The Regina A. Quick Center for the Arts is the major center of theatre and the arts at Fairfield.  The center opened in 1990 and hosts events such as popular and classical music, dance, theatre, and programs for young audiences. It houses the 740-seat Kelley Theatre, the 150-seat Lawrence A. Wien Experimental (Black Box) Theatre, and the Thomas J. Walsh Jr. Art Gallery.

The center is home to the Open VISIONS Forum, which under the direction of Dr. Philip Eliasoph brings speakers to campus to participate in dialogue about topical issues.

Fairfield University Art Museum

The Fairfield University Art Museum, opened in October 2010, is located in a 1920s Tudor mansion. Its main gallery, The Frank and Clara Meditz Gallery, is named in honor of the parents of the lead donor to the project, University Trustee John Meditz '70. It was previously known as the Bellarmine Museum.

Theatre Fairfield
Theatre Fairfield is the resident production company of the Theatre Program of the Department of Visual & Performing Arts at the university. Theatre Fairfield's season includes professionally directed and designed productions, a Festival of student-written, directed, and designed plays, performances by On the Spot, an improv company,  Director's Cut or A Class Act, which features the work of advanced directing and acting students, and independent projects created by junior and senior theatre majors.  The PepsiCo Theatre, a renovated 1922 carriage house, is the home to Theatre Fairfield. This theatrical facility includes a 70-seat flexible black box theatre, coffeehouse, dance studio, design studio and costume shop/dressing room. Veterans of Theatre Fairfield include Paul Marcarelli '92 and January LaVoy '97.

Alumni

 In academia and education, Fairfield alumni include: J. Kevin Dorsey, Interim President of the Southern Illinois University; Katherine Lapp, Executive Vice President of Harvard University; David J. McCarthy Jr., Dean Emeritus of the Georgetown University Law Center; Mark Reed, President of St. Joseph's University; Charles E. Schaefer, psychology professor considered the "Father of Play Therapy."
 In arts and entertainment, alumni include: Pat Jordan, author of A False Spring; Donald Preziosi, art historian and former Slade Professor of Fine Art at Oxford University; Bob Sullivan, two time New York Times Best Seller author and founding member of MSNBC.com; Peter McCann, country/pop-rock songwriter for Whitney Houston and more.
 In business and finance, alumni include: Donatella Arpaia, New York's 50 Most Powerful Women; E. Gerald Corrigan, seventh President of the Federal Reserve Bank of New York; William P. Egan, venture capitalist; John L. Flannery, Chairman & CEO of General Electric (GE); Kathleen Murphy, Fortune Magazine's 50 Most Powerful Business Women; Joseph DiMenna, hedge fund manager; Christopher McCormick, president & CEO of L.L.Bean; Jennifer Piepszak, CFO of JPMorgan Chase; Ronan Ryan, central character in Michael Lewis' book Flash Boys: A Wall Street Revolt
 In law and government, alumni include: John A. Danaher III, United States Attorney for the District of Connecticut; Raymond J. Dearie, Judge of the United States Foreign Intelligence Surveillance Court; Joseph P. Flynn and William J. Lavery, Chief Judges of the Connecticut Appellate Court; Martin Looney, Connecticut Senate President Pro Tempore; Jorge E. Pérez-Díaz, Attorney General of the Commonwealth of Puerto Rico.
 In medicine and science, alumni include: James Lewis Abbruzzese, Chief of the Division of Medical Oncology at the Duke Cancer Institute; Tatiana Foroud, genetic researcher and Distinguish Professor at the Indiana University School of Medicine; John T. Lis, Guggenheim Fellow and Barbara McClintock Professor of Molecular Biology & Genetics at Cornell University; Brian Monahan, Attending Physician of the United States Congress; Peter Pronovost, 2008 Time 100 World's Most Influential People and MacArthur Fellow; Caitlin O'Connell-Rodwell, world-renowned elephant expert.
 In social justice, alumni include: G. Simon Harak, Pax Christi National Peacemaker of the Year; Paula Donovan, the founding executive director of AIDS-Free World; Joseph Moylan, founder and president of Durham Nativity School.

See also
 List of Jesuit sites

References

External links
 
 

 
Educational institutions established in 1942
Fairfield, Connecticut
Jesuit universities and colleges in the United States
Roman Catholic Diocese of Bridgeport
Universities and colleges in Fairfield County, Connecticut
Buildings and structures in Fairfield, Connecticut
Association of Catholic Colleges and Universities
Catholic universities and colleges in Connecticut
1942 establishments in Connecticut
Census-designated places in Fairfield County, Connecticut
Census-designated places in Connecticut